Joshua Henry Davey (born 3 August 1990) is a Scottish cricketer, who plays for Somerset County Cricket Club having previously played for Middlesex as well as representing his country in One Day Internationals (ODIs) and Twenty20 Internationals. He is a right-handed batsman and right-arm medium pace bowler. He was educated at South Lee Prep School and then Culford School, in Suffolk.

County career
In April 2010, Davey made his county debut for Middlesex against Northamptonshire in the Clydesdale Bank 40 competition. He made his first-class debut a month later against Oxford University Cricket Club, he scored two fifties in the match and shared an opening partnership of 192 with Sam Robson in the first innings.

On 15 April 2014, Davey was awarded a summer contract for the 2014 season with Somerset.

International career
On 15 June 2010, Davey made his ODI debut against the Netherlands, opening the batting he scored 24 and coming on as first change he took 1/27 from seven overs. In his fourth ODI, he returned figures of 5/9 in 7.2 overs against Afghanistan. This is the best bowling analysis for Scotland in ODIs.

On 14 January 2015, Davey added his name to the list of outstanding all round performances in an ODI by scoring 53 not out and picking 6 wickets for 28 runs against Afghanistan at Sheikh Zayed Stadium, Abu Dhabi in a triangular series which also involved Ireland.

In September 2019, he was named in Scotland's squad for the 2019 ICC T20 World Cup Qualifier tournament in the United Arab Emirates. In September 2021, Davey was named in Scotland's provisional squad for the 2021 ICC Men's T20 World Cup.

References

External links

1990 births
Living people
Cricketers at the 2015 Cricket World Cup
Cricketers from Aberdeen
Hampshire cricketers
Middlesex cricketers
People educated at Culford School
Scotland One Day International cricketers
Scotland Twenty20 International cricketers
Scottish cricketers
Somerset cricketers
Suffolk cricketers